M. Norton (full name and dates of birth and death unknown) was an English cricketer. Norton's batting style is unknown.

Norton made a single appearance in first-class cricket for the Marylebone Cricket Club (MCC) against Oxford University in 1837 at Lord's. In a match which the Oxford University won by 4 wickets, Norton scored 4 runs in the MCC first-innings before he was dismissed by Edward Grimston, while in their second-innings he was dismissed for the same score by Charles Beauclerk.

References

External links
M. Norton at ESPNcricinfo
M. Norton at CricketArchive

English cricketers
Marylebone Cricket Club cricketers